Ryan Ravenscroft (born 31 January 1981) is a South African former field hockey player who competed in the 2004 Summer Olympics.

References

External links

1981 births
Living people
Field hockey players from Johannesburg
South African male field hockey players
Olympic field hockey players of South Africa
Field hockey players at the 2004 Summer Olympics